The Austria women's national basketball team represents Austria in international women's basketball competition. The team is controlled by the Austrian Basketball Federation.

Competitions

EuroBasket

See also
 Austria men's national basketball team
 Austria women's national under-19 basketball team
 Austria women's national under-17 basketball team
 Austria women's national 3x3 team

References

External links
Official website
Austria National Team - Women Presentation at Eurobasket.com
Archived records of Austria team participations

 
Women's national basketball teams